Shuangyang District is one of seven districts of the prefecture-level city of Changchun, the capital of Jilin Province, Northeast China, forming part of the city's southeastern suburbs. It borders the districts of Erdao to the north and Nanguan to the northwest, as well as the prefecture-level cities of Jilin to the south and east and Siping to the southwest.

Administrative divisions
There are four subdistricts, four towns, and one ethnic township.

Subdistricts:
Pinghu Subdistrict, Yunshan Subdistrict, Sheling Subdistrict, Shanhe Subdistrict

Towns:
Taiping, Luxiang, Tuding, Qijia

The only township is Shuangyingzi Hui Ethnic Township

Climate

References

County-level divisions of Jilin
Changchun